Anita Moreno Regional Hospital is a medium district general hospital near La Villa de Los Santos, Los Santos Province, Panama, run by the Ministerio de Salud.  The hospital is located north-west of the village of El Ejido on Belisario Porras Road.

The hospital is under expansion by IBT Group on the site of the previous hospital at a cost of £102.9 million. Building work was started in the year 2012.

Location
It is surrounded by woodland on two sides.

History

The hospital was built on the site of what was originally a potrero that belonged to Anita Moreno. The site became a hospital in 1970, occupying 2 hectares of a 10 hectares lot.

New hospital
The new hospital will replace both the psychiatric hospital and the specialty hospital. It has 257 beds and provides a full range of clinical services including an Accident and Emergency department. The new hospital is expected to have 257 beds and will cover a population of 100,000 inhabitants in the Azuero region. Due to construction delays, the hospital will not be completed until 2019; it will be the only level 3 or 4 hospital in the region.

See also
 Los Santos Province

References 

Hospitals in Panama
Los Santos Province